The Ituí River is a river of the upper Amazon Basin. It traverses some 370 km of the Atalaia do Norte municipality in the Amazonas state of north-western Brazil. It drains a very low gradient, dropping hardly 100 m over its whole extent, which results in extensive meandering. The Rio Negro, Beija-flor and Branquinho are some of its western tributaries, while the Rio Novo is its main eastern tributary. Downstream it joins the Itaquai River to form the upper Solimões.

See also
Korubo
List of rivers of Amazonas
Vale do Javari

References

Brazilian Ministry of Transport

Rivers of Amazonas (Brazilian state)